The 2022–23 NorthPort Batang Pier season was the 10th season of the franchise in the Philippine Basketball Association (PBA).

Key dates
May 15: The PBA Season 47 draft was held at the Robinsons Place Manila in Manila.

Draft picks

Roster

Philippine Cup

Eliminations

Standings

Game log

|-bgcolor=ccffcc
| 1
| June 9
| Rain or Shine
| W 94–81
| Robert Bolick (22)
| Jamie Malonzo (15)
| Bolick, Sumang (6)
| Ynares Center
| 1–0
|-bgcolor=ccffcc
| 2
| June 11
| Terrafirma
| W 100–86
| Robert Bolick (26)
| Jamie Malonzo (16)
| Robert Bolick (10)
| Ynares Center
| 2–0
|-bgcolor=ffcccc
| 3
| June 15
| Magnolia
| L 77–80
| Arwind Santos (18)
| Arwind Santos (12)
| Roi Sumang (4)
| SM Mall of Asia Arena
| 2–1
|-bgcolor=ffcccc
| 4
| June 18
| Blackwater
| L 90–97
| Robert Bolick (21)
| Malonzo, Santos (13)
| Roi Sumang (5)
| Ynares Center
| 2–2
|-bgcolor=ffcccc
| 5
| June 23
| Meralco
| L 87–97
| Jamie Malonzo (21)
| Jamie Malonzo (9)
| Robert Bolick (7)
| Ynares Center
| 2–3
|-bgcolor=ffcccc
| 6
| June 29
| TNT
| L 112–117
| Jamie Malonzo (27)
| Jamie Malonzo (8)
| Roi Sumang (10)
| Smart Araneta Coliseum
| 2–4

|-bgcolor=ffcccc
| 7
| July 2
| San Miguel
| L 106–122
| Arwind Santos (25)
| Jamie Malonzo (9)
| Jerrick Balanza (7)
| Smart Araneta Coliseum
| 2–5
|-bgcolor=ffcccc
| 8
| July 9
| Converge
| L 98–104
| Kevin Ferrer (21)
| Arwind Santos (12)
| Roi Sumang (8)
| Smart Araneta Coliseum
| 2–6
|-bgcolor=ccffcc
| 9
| July 14
| Phoenix
| W 95–92
| Ferrer, Sumang (18)
| Jamie Malonzo (8)
| Bolick, Sumang (8)
| Smart Araneta Coliseum
| 3–6
|-bgcolor=ffcccc
| 10
| July 17
| Barangay Ginebra
| L 93–100
| Robert Bolick (29)
| Arwind Santos (9)
| Roi Sumang (5)
| Smart Araneta Coliseum
| 3–7
|-bgcolor=ffcccc
| 11
| July 22
| NLEX
| L 95–109
| JM Calma (21)
| JM Calma (9)
| Roi Sumang (10)
| Smart Araneta Coliseum
| 3–8

Commissioner's Cup

Eliminations

Standings

Game log

|-bgcolor=ccffcc
| 1
| September 21, 2022
| Phoenix
| W 92–89
| Robert Bolick (21)
| Prince Ibeh (15)
| Arvin Tolentino (7)
| SM Mall of Asia Arena
| 1–0
|-bgcolor=ffcccc
| 2
| September 24, 2022
| Bay Area
| L 104–105
| Robert Bolick (33)
| Prince Ibeh (11)
| Robert Bolick (5)
| SM Mall of Asia Arena
| 1–1
|-bgcolor=ccffcc
| 3
| September 30, 2022
| Meralco
| W 101–95 (OT)
| Robert Bolick (44)
| Prince Ibeh (11)
| Robert Bolick (7)
| Smart Araneta Coliseum
| 2–1

|-bgcolor=ffcccc
| 4
| October 8, 2022
| TNT
| L 93–117
| Arvin Tolentino (19)
| Prince Ibeh (12)
| Robert Bolick (7)
| PhilSports Arena
| 2–2
|-bgcolor=ccffcc
| 5
| October 12, 2022
| Blackwater
| W 87–83
| Prince Ibeh (19)
| Prince Ibeh (10)
| Robert Bolick (10)
| Smart Araneta Coliseum
| 3–2
|-bgcolor=ffcccc
| 6
| October 16, 2022
| Magnolia
| L 91–109
| Kevin Ferrer (19)
| Prince Ibeh (13)
| Balanza, Sumang, Tolentino (3)
| Smart Araneta Coliseum
| 3–3
|-bgcolor=ffcccc
| 7
| October 26, 2022
| San Miguel
| L 86–104
| Prince Ibeh (16)
| Prince Ibeh (16)
| Robert Bolick (7)
| Ynares Center
| 3–4

|-bgcolor=ffcccc
| 8
| November 4, 2022
| Rain or Shine
| L 75–76
| Robert Bolick (18)
| Ibeh, Navarro (11)
| Bolick, Sumang (4)
| Smart Araneta Coliseum
| 3–5
|-bgcolor=ccffcc
| 9
| November 9, 2022
| NLEX
| W 107–94
| Robert Bolick (33)
| Prince Ibeh (17)
| Bolick, Navarro (7)
| Smart Araneta Coliseum
| 4–5
|-bgcolor=ccffcc
| 10
| November 12, 2022
| Terrafirma
| W 91–85
| Arvin Tolentino (31)
| Prince Ibeh (17)
| Robert Bolick (10)
| Ynares Center
| 5–5
|-bgcolor=ccffcc
| 11
| November 20, 2022
| Converge
| W 112–97
| William Navarro (29)
| William Navarro (17)
| Robert Bolick (10)
| Smart Araneta Coliseum
| 6–5
|-bgcolor=ffcccc
| 12
| November 27, 2022
| Barangay Ginebra
| L 105–122
| Arvin Tolentino (24)
| Prince Ibeh (13)
| Navarro, Sumang (5)
| PhilSports Arena
| 6–6

Playoffs

Bracket

Game log

|-bgcolor=ffcccc
| 1
| December 7, 2022
| Barangay Ginebra
| L 102–118
| Arvin Tolentino (29)
| Prince Ibeh (15)
| Robert Bolick (6)
| PhilSports Arena
| 0–1
|-bgcolor=ffcccc
| 2
| December 10, 2022
| Barangay Ginebra
| L 93–99
| Jeff Chan (20)
| Prince Ibeh (12)
| Jeff Chan (6)
| PhilSports Arena
| 0–2

Governors' Cup

Eliminations

Standings

Game log

|-bgcolor=ffcccc
| 1
| January 22
| Converge
| L 92–122
| Marcus Weathers (37)
| Marcus Weathers (12)
| Chan, Salado, Weathers, Zamar (2)
| PhilSports Arena
| 0–1
|-bgcolor=ffcccc
| 2
| January 26
| Meralco
| L 102–107
| Marcus Weathers (29)
| Marcus Weathers (14)
| Roi Sumang (6)
| PhilSports Arena
| 0–2
|-bgcolor=ffcccc
| 3
| January 28
| NLEX
| L 112–121
| Marcus Weathers (30)
| JM Calma (12)
| Weathers, Zamar (4)
| Ynares Center
| 0–3

|-bgcolor=ffcccc
| 4
| February 2
| Phoenix
| L 97–108
| Marcus Weathers (31)
| Marcus Weathers (9)
| Jeff Chan (4)
| PhilSports Arena
| 0–4
|-bgcolor=ffcccc
| 5
| February 10
| Barangay Ginebra
| L 100–115
| Kevin Murphy (38)
| Kevin Murphy (11)
| Kevin Murphy (4)
| SM Mall of Asia Arena
| 0–5
|-bgcolor=ffcccc
| 6
| February 15
| San Miguel
| L 132–145 
| Kevin Murphy (39)
| Kevin Murphy (13)
| Robert Bolick (10)
| SM Mall of Asia Arena
| 0–6
|-bgcolor=ccffcc
| 7
| February 22
| Terrafirma
| W 115–100
| Kevin Murphy (28) 
| Bolick, Calma, Murphy (9)
| Jeff Chan (9)
| PhilSports Arena
| 1–6
|-bgcolor=ccffcc
| 8
| February 25
| Blackwater
| W 110–104 
| Kevin Murphy (47) 
| Kevin Murphy (16) 
| Robert Bolick (6)
| Smart Araneta Coliseum
| 2–6

|-bgcolor=ffcccc
| 9
| March 2
| Magnolia
| L 109–129
| Kevin Murphy (31)
| Calma, Murphy (6)
| Kevin Murphy (6) 
| Smart Araneta Coliseum
| 2–7
|-bgcolor=ccffcc
| 10
| March 4
| Rain or Shine
| W 113–97 
| Kevin Murphy (39)
| Kevin Murphy (13) 
| Robert Bolick (7)
| PhilSports Arena
| 3–7
|- align="center"
|colspan="9" bgcolor="#bbcaff"|All-Star Break
|-bgcolor=ffcccc
| 11
| March 15
| TNT
| L 110–134
| Kevin Murphy (35)
| Kevin Murphy (10) 
| Robert Bolick (6)
| PhilSports Arena
| 3–8

Transactions

Free agency

Signings

Trades

Pre-season

Mid-season

Commissioner's Cup

Recruited imports

References

NorthPort Batang Pier seasons
NorthPort Batang Pier